The Banu Qatadah, or the Qatadids, were a dynasty of Hasanid sharifs that held the Sharifate of Mecca continuously from 1201 until its abolition in 1925. The Qatadids were the last of four dynasties of Hasanid sharifs (preceded by the Jafarids/Musawids, Sulaymanids, and the Hawashim) that all together ruled Mecca since about the mid-10th century. The progenitor of the dynasty was Qatadah ibn Idris, who took possession of the holy city from the Hawashim in 1201. The Emirate remained in the possession of his descendants until 1925 when the last Sharif of Mecca, Ali ibn al-Husayn, surrendered the Kingdom of Hejaz to Ibn Saud, Sultan of Nejd. The House of Bolkiah, which rules Brunei, claims Qatadid descent and Sayyid status from their ancestor Sharif Ali's grandfather Emir Rumaythah.

See also 
 Qatada

References

Arab dynasties
 
Qatada
Sharifate of Mecca